Vasil Venkov (1903 – 1975) was a Bulgarian long-distance runner. He competed in the men's 10,000 metres at the 1924 Summer Olympics.

References

External links
 

1903 births
1975 deaths
Athletes (track and field) at the 1924 Summer Olympics
Bulgarian male long-distance runners
Olympic athletes of Bulgaria
Place of birth missing
20th-century Bulgarian people